The 2014 Tour du Haut Var was the 46th edition of the Tour du Haut Var cycle race and was held on 22–23 February 2014. The race started in Le Cannet-des-Maures and finished in Draguignan. The race was won by Carlos Betancur.

General classification

References

2014
2014 in road cycling
2014 in French sport